Sir John Leigh, 1st Baronet (3 August 1884 – 28 July 1959) was a British mill-owner, who used his fortune to buy a newspaper and launch his career as a Conservative politician.

Leigh, whose family resided for generations at Pennington was descended from a cadet branch of the Barons Leigh (of the first creation) and was educated at Manchester Grammar School.

Leigh made his fortune in the Lancashire cotton industry. In February 1918, he was created a baronet of Altrincham in Cheshire, and around 1921 he purchased the Pall Mall Gazette. Sir John was rumoured at the time to be worth fourteen million pounds.

He was elected as Member of Parliament (MP) for the Clapham division of Wandsworth at a by-election in May 1922 after the resignation of the Conservative MP Sir Arthur du Cros, and held the seat until retiring at the 1945 general election.

See also

 Baronetage of the United Kingdom
 Leigh baronets

References

External links 
 

1884 births
1959 deaths
People from Wigan
People from Altrincham
People educated at Manchester Grammar School
Conservative Party (UK) MPs for English constituencies
UK MPs 1918–1922
UK MPs 1922–1923
UK MPs 1923–1924
UK MPs 1924–1929
UK MPs 1929–1931
UK MPs 1931–1935
UK MPs 1935–1945
Baronets in the Baronetage of the United Kingdom
British newspaper publishers (people)